Transport and golgi organization 2 homolog (TANGO2) also known as chromosome 22 open reading frame 25 (C22orf25) is a protein that in humans is encoded by the TANGO2 gene.

The function of C22orf25 is not currently known.  It is characterized by the NRDE superfamily domain (DUF883), which is strictly known for the conserved amino acid sequence of (N)-Asparagine (R)-Arginine (D)-Aspartic Acid (E)-Glutamic Acid.  This domain is found among distantly related species from the six kingdoms: Eubacteria, Archaebacteria, Protista, Fungi, Plantae, and Animalia and is known to be involved in Golgi organization and protein secretion.  It is likely that it localizes in the cytoplasm but is anchored in the cell membrane by the second amino acid.    C22orf25 is also xenologous to T10 like proteins in the Fowlpox Virus and Canarypox Virus.  The gene coding for C22orf25 is located on chromosome 22 and the location q11.21, so it is often associated with 22q11.2 deletion syndrome.

Protein

Gene neighborhood 

The C22orf25 gene is located on the long arm (q) of chromosome 22 in region 1, band 1, and sub-band 2 (22q11.21) starting at 20,008,631 base pairs and ending at 20,053,447 base pairs.   There is a 1.5-3.0 Mb deletion containing around 30-40 genes, spanning this region that causes the most survivable genetic deletion disorder known as 22q11.2 deletion syndrome, which is most commonly known as DiGeorge syndrome or Velocaridofacial syndrome. 22q11.2 deletion syndrome has a vast array of phenotypes and is not attributed to the loss of a single gene.  The vast phenotypes arise from deletions of not only DiGeorge Syndrome Critical Region (DGCR) genes and disease genes but other unidentified genes as well.

C22orf25 is in close proximity to DGCR8 as well as other genes known to play a part in DiGeorge Syndrome such as armadillo repeat gene deleted in Velocardiofacial syndrome (ARVCF), Cathechol-O-methyltransferase (COMT) and T-box 1 (TBX1).

Predicted mRNA features

Promoter 

The promoter for the C22orf25 gene spans 687 base pairs from 20,008,092 to 20,008,878 with a predicted transcriptional start site that is 104 base pairs and spans from 20,008,591 to 20,008,694.  The promoter region and beginning of the C22orf25 gene (20,008,263 to 20,009,250) is not conserved past primates.  This region was used to determine transcription factor interactions.

Transcription factors 

Some of the main transcription factors that bind to the promoter are listed below.

Expression analysis 

Expression data from Expressed Sequence Tag mapping, microarray and in situ hybridization show high expression for Homo sapiens in the blood, bone marrow and nerves.  Expression is not restricted to these areas and low expression is seen elsewhere in the body. In Caenorhabditis elegans, the snt-1 gene (C22orf25 homologue) was expressed in the nerve ring, ventral and dorsal cord processes, sites of neuromuscular junctions, and in neurons.

Evolutionary history 

The NRDE (DUF883) domain, is a domain of unknown function spanning majority of the C22orf25 gene and is found among distantly related species, including viruses.

Predicted protein features

Post translational modifications 

Post translational modifications of the C22orf25 gene that are evolutionarily conserved in the Animalia and Plantae kingdoms as well as the Canarypox Virus include glycosylation (C-mannosylation),  glycation,  phosphorylation (kinase specific),  and palmitoylation.

Predicted topology 

C22orf25 localizes to the cytoplasm and is anchored to the cell membrane by the second amino acid.  As mentioned previously, the second amino acid is modified by palmitoylation.  Palmitoylation is known to contribute to membrane association because it contributes to enhanced hydrophobicity. Palmitoylation is known to play a role in the modulation of proteins' trafficking, stability and sorting. Palmitoylation is also involved in cellular signaling and neuronal transmission.

Protein Interactions 

C22orf25 has been shown to interact with NFKB1,  RELA, RELB, BTRC, RPS27A, BCL3, MAP3K8, NFKBIA, SIN3A, SUMO1, Tat.

Clinical significance 

Mutations in the TANGO2 gene may cause defects in mitochondrial β-oxidation and increased endoplasmic reticulum stress and a reduction in Golgi volume density.  These mutations results in early onset hypoglycemia, hyperammonemia, rhabdomyolysis, cardiac arrhythmias, and encephalopathy that later develops into cognitive impairment.

References

External links
  www.tango2.it - Disease website
  www.tango2research.org - Research disease website -